Chaole is a town in Meitan County, Zunyi, Guizhou, China. Chaole has an agricultural service center. , it administers Luohuatun Residential Neighborhood and the following five villages:
Ganxi Village
Shatang Village
Heping Village
Qunxing Village
Qunfeng Village

References 

Towns in Guizhou
Meitan County